Jamna may refer to:

 Jamna (bird), an extinct passeriform bird from early Oligocene deposits in Poland
 Jamna, Slovenia, a settlement in northeastern Slovenia
 Jamna, Lesser Poland Voivodeship, a village in Lesser Poland Voivodeship, Poland
 Jamna Górna and Jamna Dolna, two non-existing villages in Subcarpathian Voivodeship, Poland
 Yamuna River, also known as Jamna, a major river of northern India
 Jamna, the stream in the city of Mikołów, Silesia, Poland
 Popular Front of Islamic Revolution Forces (JAMNA),  political organization in Iran

See also
 Yamna (disambiguation)
 Jamuna (disambiguation)
 Jamna Auto Industries, an Indian multinational Automotive parts company